Isle is a commune in the Haute-Vienne department in the Nouvelle-Aquitaine region in west-central France.

As of 2019, Isle is the fifth commune of the department (by population), after Limoges, Saint-Junien, Panazol and Couzeix.

Population

Inhabitants are known as Islois in French.

See also
Communes of the Haute-Vienne department

References

Communes of Haute-Vienne